Ghulam Hussain is a male Muslim given name. In Persian-language use it is usually transliterated as Gholam Hossein. It may refer to

People  
Ghulam Husain Salim (18th-century – c. 1817), Indian historian of Bengal
Gholam Hussein-Khan Tabatabai  (c. 1728 – ?), Mughal historian and author of Seir Mutaqherin, (also rendered Siyar-ul-Mutakherin)
Badruddin Ghulam Hussain Miya Khan Saheb (active ca. 1900), founder of the Atba-e-Malak Badar branch of Mustaali Ismaili Shi'a Islam
Ghulam Hussain Hidayatullah (1879–1948), politician from Sindh, Pakistan
Maharaj Ghulam Hussain Kathak (1905–2001), Pakistani classical dancer
Gholam-Hossein Naghshineh (1908–1996), Iranian actor
Gholamhossein Mosaheb (1910–1979), Iranian mathematician
Gholam-Hossein Banan (1911–1986), Iranian musician
Gholam Hossein Sadighi (1905–1992), Iranian politician
Qolamhossein Bigjekhani (1918–1987), Iranian musician and tar player
Gholamhossein Bigdeli (1919–1998), Iranian political and literary figure
Gholam Hossein Jahanshahi (1920–2005), Iranian politician
Ghulam Hussain Chaudry (1926–1971), Pakistan Army officer
Gholamhossein Ebrahimi Dinani (born 1934), Iranian philosopher
Gholam-Hossein Sa'edi (1936–1985), Iranian writer
Ghulam Hussain (politician) (born 1936), Pakistani medical practitioner and politician
Gholam Hossein Amirkhani (born 1939), Iranian calligrapher
Gholamhussein Lotfi (born 1949), Iranian actor, film director and screenwriter
Gholam Hossein Mazloumi (1950–2014), Iranian footballer
Gholamhossein Karbaschi (born 1954), Iranian politician
Gholam-Hossein Nozari (born 1954), Iranian politician
Gholam Hossein Nuri (born 1954), Iranian painter and director
Gholam Hossein Peyrovani (born 1955), Iranian footballer
Gholam-Hossein Mohseni-Eje'i (born 1956), Iranian lawyer and politician
Gholam-Hossein Elham (born 1959), Iranian politician
Ghulam Hussain khan(born 17th century), musician, father of Safdar Hussain khan and Grandfather of Ustad Faiyaz Khan

Places 
Gholam Hoseyn Kandi, village in Ardabil Province
Mowtowr-e Gholam Hoseyn Kuhestani, village in Kerman Province
Chah-e Gholamhoseyn, village in Kerman Province
Gholam Hoseyn-e Hafezi, village in Khuzestan Province
Chegarman-e Gholamhoseyn, village in Khuzestan Province
Kalateh-ye Molla Gholamhoseyn, village in North Khorasan Province